Lake Goodrich is a lake located in Waterford Township, Michigan, USA. It lies east of Hospital Rd., south of Highland Rd. (M-59) and north of Pontiac Lake Rd.
The four-acre lake is spring fed.

References

Lakes of Oakland County, Michigan
Lakes of Waterford Township, Michigan